Staga is a monotypic genus of moths of the family Noctuidae, containing the single species Staga producta from Madagascar.

References

Mabille, P. 1900. Lepidoptera nova malgassica et africana. - Annales de la Société Entomologique de France 68 (1899):723–753.
Natural History Museum Lepidoptera genus database

Hypeninae
Monotypic moth genera
Moths of Madagascar